Marcus Leatherdale (18 September 1952 – 22 April 2022 in Montreal) was a Canadian portrait photographer.

Biography

Early life and education 
Marcus Andrew Leatherdale was born on 18 September 1952, in Montreal, Canada, to Jack Leatherdale, a veterinarian, and Grace Leatherdale, a homemaker. He attended the San Francisco Art Institute.

New York City 
Leatherdale arrived in New York City in 1978, where he attended the School of Visual Arts. started his career in New York City during the early eighties, setting up a studio on Grand Street.

Leatherdale first served as Robert Mapplethorpe's office manager for a while and was photographed in the nude by the master, grabbing a rope with his right hand and holding a rabbit in his left. 

Thereafter he worked as an assistant curator to Sam Wagstaff. He soon became a darling of the then vibrant club scene and the fashionable media: Interview, Details, The New Yorker, Vanity Fair, and Elle Decor presented his work. Later on he was featured in artsy publications as Artforum, Art News, and Art in America. He documented the New York City life style, the extraordinary people of Danceteria and Club 57 where he staged his first exhibits in 1980. Leatherdale was an acute observer of the New York City of the nineteen eighties. His models were the unknown but exceptional ones – like Larissa, Claudia Summers or Ruby Zebra – or well known artists – like Madonna, Keith Haring, Andy Warhol, Winston Tong and Divine, Trisha Brown, Lisa Lyon, Andrée Putman, Kathy Acker, Jodie Foster, and fellow photographer John Dugdale. For quite a while Leatherdale remained in Mapplethorpe's shadow, but was soon discovered as a creative force in his own right by Christian Michelides, the founder of Molotov Art Gallery in Vienna. Leatherdale flew to Vienna, presented his work there and was acclaimed by public and press.

This international recognition paved his way to museums and permanent collections such as the Rheinisches Landesmuseum Bonn, the Art Institute of Chicago, the Australian National Gallery in Canberra, the London Museum in London, Ontario, and Austria's Albertina. Above all, his arresting portraits of New York City celebrities in the series Hidden Identities aroused long-lasting interest amongst curators and collectors.

India 
In 1993, Leatherdale began spending half of each year in India's holy city of Banaras. Based in an ancient house in the centre of the old city, he began photographing the diverse and remarkable people there, from the holy men to celebrities, from royalty to tribals, carefully negotiating his way among some of India's most elusive figures to make his portraits. From the outset, his intention was to pay homage to the timeless spirit of India through a highly specific portrayal of its individuals. His pictures include princesses and boatmen, movie stars and circus performers, and street beggars and bishops, mothers and children in traditional garb. Leatherdale explored how essentially unaffected much of the country was by the passage of time; and it has been remarked upon that this approach is distinctly post-colonial. In 1999, Leatherdale relocated to Chottanagpur (Jharkhand) where he focusing uoon the Adivasis. Later Serra da Estrela in the mountains of central Portugal became his second home base.

Leatherdale's matte printing techniques, which adapt nineteenth-century processes and employ half black, half sepia colorations, reinforce the timelessness of his subjects. Tones and matte surfaces effectively differentiate his portraits from the easy slickness of fashion photography.

Later life and death 
In 2019, Mr. Leatherdale compiled his work from 80s in a book entitled “Out of the Shadows”, written with Summers.

Leatherdale suffered a stroke in 2021. He committed suicide at the age of 69 on 22 April 2022 at his home in Mcluskieganj, India. He is survived by a brother, Robert, and an adopted son, Kailash.

Personal life and relationships 
In 1979, Leatherdale married Claudia Summers. The couple divorced in 2018.

During his time in New York City, he dated Robert Mapplethorpe, whose photography studio Leatherdale managed. His partner of two decades, Jorge Serio, died in July 2021.

Major exhibitions

Books
New York 1983. His photographs and text by Kathy Acker and Christian Michelides. A book in a series on people and years. Vienna: Molotov 1983, 
Marcus Leatherdale: 1984–1987. Introduction by Brooks Adams. Greathouse Gallery 1987
Marcus Leatherdale 1980–1994. 2009
Hidden Identities.Selected Images from Details magazine 1982 to 1990.  2009
Facing India. Portraits of Bharat-India. Westzone Pub Ltd 2010 
Adivasi. Portraits of Tribal India.
Out of the Shadows. Marcus Leatherdale: Photographs. New York City 1980–1992 by Marcus Leatherdale, Claudia Summers, Paul Bridgewater. London: ACC Art Books, 2019. 

In 2010, Marcus Leatherdale founded www.theOMENmag.com a quarterly online Art magazine of which he was the art editor and art director.

References

External links
 Marcus Leatherdale, personal website
 , TV report about the exhibit
 Tribal Visions: A Conversation with Marcus Leatherdale, interview with the artist
 founder of OMENmag online Art magazine /Art editor/Art director.
 
 
 Marcus Leatherdale at MOMA

1952 births
2022 deaths
Photographers from New York (state)